is the fourth single from the Japanese pop group Cute, released on July 29, 2006  on fb indie label.

This title is a play on words being that "Wakkyanaize" itself has no true meaning. It is only an indirect translation of colloquial  into the English idiom "it's easy", after being deformed deliberately to achieve an English-sounding title.

This song was their initial original tune, and was first sung on November 27, 2005, at a fan club event.

This was the final release to feature Megumi Murakami.

Track listing 
 
 "Wakkyanai (Z)" (Instrumental)

References

External links 
 Wakkyanai (Z) in the Hello! Project official discography
 Wakkyanai(Z) entry on the Up-Front Works official website

2006 singles
Japanese-language songs
Cute (Japanese idol group) songs
Songs written by Tsunku
Song recordings produced by Tsunku
2006 songs